Jaars, capitalized as JAARS on some maps, is a census-designated place (CDP) in Union County, North Carolina, United States. The population was 597 at the 2010 census. The region's name comes from JAARS, a non-profit organization that is located there.

Geography
JAARS is located at  (34.862297, -80.747115).

Demographics

As of 2000, there were 360 people, 126 households, and 100 families residing in the CDP. The population density was 424.7 people per square mile (163.5/km2). There were 173 housing units at an average density of 204.1/sq mi (78.6/km2). The racial makeup of the CDP was 97.50% White, 0.28% Asian, 1.94% from other races, and 0.28% from two or more races. Hispanic or Latino of any race were 2.22% of the population.

There were 126 households, out of which 29.4% had children under the age of 18 living with them, 73.0% were married couples living together, 6.3% had a female householder with no husband present, and 20.6% were non-families. 17.5% of all households were made up of individuals, and 11.9% had someone living alone who was 65 years of age or older. The average household size was 2.86 and the average family size was 3.23.

In the CDP, the population was spread out, with 27.5% under the age of 18, 5.6% from 18 to 24, 18.3% from 25 to 44, 21.7% from 45 to 64, and 26.9% who were 65 years of age or older. The median age was 44 years. For every 100 females, there were 87.5 males. For every 100 females age 18 and over, there were 86.4 males.

The median income for a household in the CDP was $51,591, and the median income for a family was $51,250. Males had a median income of $35,278 versus $53,750 for females. The per capita income for the CDP was $18,433. About 11.5% of families and 10.3% of the population were below the poverty line, including none of those under age 18 and 55.1% of those age 65 or over.

See also
 JAARS

References

Census-designated places in North Carolina
Census-designated places in Union County, North Carolina